The Loefling Zoo Also Zoological Park Loefling Is a publicly owned zoological garden located southwest of Cachamay Park, in Ciudad Guayana, part of the Bolivar State in the Venezuelan Guayana region. It received its name in honor of the Swedish botanist Pehr Löfling. He was one of the first to make the fauna and flora of this region known to science, and he died near Ciudad Guayana.

Its administration and management are a responsibility of the Venezuelan Guiana Corporation (CVG, Corporación Venezolana de Guayana) under the supervision of the National Foundation of Zoological Parks and Aquariums of Venezuela. (ZOO-AC-V015)

Among the species that can be seen in this park are: the Orinoco caiman, monkeys, deer, barnacles, chiguires (capybara), babas, baculi, reptiles, morrocoyes (tortoises) and many other species that inhabit there, some in controlled captivity and others in shape natural.

Also, you can admire beautiful trees like mahogany, samanes, araguaneyes, apamates, oaks and ceibas.

Gallery

See also
List of national parks of Venezuela
Las Delicias Zoo

References

Zoos in Venezuela
Ciudad Guayana